The Mayor From Ireland is a 1912 American silent film produced by Kalem Company and distributed by General Films. It was directed by Sidney Olcott with Gene Gauntier, Jack J. Clark  and J.P. McGowan in the leading roles.

Cast
 Gene Gauntier - Bridget O'Donovan
 Jack J. Clark - Terry O'Donovan 
 J.P. McGowan - Shamus Foley

Production notes
The film was shot in Beaufort, co Kerry, Ireland, and in the USA, during the summer of 1912.

References
 Michel Derrien, Aux origines du cinéma irlandais: Sidney Olcott, le premier oeil, TIR 2013.

External links

 The Mayor From Ireland website dedicated to Sidney Olcott

1912 films
Silent American drama films
American silent short films
Films set in Ireland
Films shot in Ireland
Films directed by Sidney Olcott
1912 short films
1912 drama films
American black-and-white films
1910s American films